Astrothelium sipmanii is a species of corticolous (bark-dwelling) lichen in the family Trypetheliaceae. It is found in Guyana.

Taxonomy
The lichens was formally described as a new species in 2016 by Dutch lichenologist André Aptroot. The type was collected by Harrie Sipman in the Upper Takutu District; here, in savannah forest, it was found growing on the smooth bark of trees. The species epithet acknowledges the collector of the type.

Description
The lichen has a pale ochraceous-green thallus with a cortex; the thallus is surrounded by a thin (≤1 mm wide) black prothallus. The ascomata are pear-shaped (pyriform), measuring 0.7–1.2 mm in diameter. The ascomatal walls are carbonized (blackened) and up to about 80 µm thick; the ostioles (pores) are apically situated, black, and concave. Astrothelium sipmanii makes ellipsoid-shaped ascospores with 5 septa, and measure 100–150 by 35–40 µm. The hamathecium (i.e., all of the hyphae or other tissues between the asci) is inspersed (scattered with) with oil globules. No lichen products were detected in the collected specimens using thin-layer chromatography.

Astrothelium curvisporum and A. pustulatum share some similar characteristics, but can be distinguished by differences in spore shape and septation.

References

sipmanii
Lichen species
Lichens described in 2016
Lichens of Guyana
Taxa named by André Aptroot